Cuneo railway station, or Cuneo Altipiano railway station ( or Stazione di Cuneo Altipiano), is the main station serving the city and comune of Cuneo, in the Piedmont region, northwestern Italy.  Opened in 1937, it is the junction of the Fossano–Cuneo, Savigliano–Cuneo, Cuneo–Ventimiglia and Cuneo–Mondovì railways.

The station is currently managed by Rete Ferroviaria Italiana (RFI).  However, the commercial area of the passenger building is managed by Centostazioni.  Train services are operated by Trenitalia.  Each of these companies is a subsidiary of Ferrovie dello Stato (FS), Italy's state-owned rail company.

The other station in the city, Cuneo Gesso, forms part of the Cuneo–Mondovì railway, and is not far from the hamlet of Borgo San Giuseppe (formerly Borgo Gesso).

Location
Cuneo railway station is situated in Piazzale della Libertà, west of the city.

History
The station was opened on 7 November 1937 by the Communications Minister, Antonio Stefano Benni, together with the new Madonna Olmo–Plateau Cuneo–Borgo San Dalmazzo line, which replaced the old Cuneo Gesso–Boves–Borgo San Dalmazzo line.

Features
The station yard consists of five tracks for passengers (numbered from track 1 to track 6, track 2 being used for altering the composition of the trains), and eight other tracks for goods traffic.

The locomotive depot is positioned to the south of the station yard and is connected to it by a double track line.

Since 30 March 2009, the station has been equipped with a new public information system that communicates directly with the equipment used for the management of trains, ensuring timely and up to date information transfer. The station also now has new loudspeakers and monitors, which are operated using a modern information technology system.

Passenger movements
The station has about 3 million passenger movements each year.

It is served by regional trains to Turin and Savona, both via Fossano, and, via Mondovì, to Saluzzo, Ventimiglia and Nice.

See also

History of rail transport in Italy
List of railway stations in Piedmont
Rail transport in Italy
Railway stations in Italy

References

Notes

Further reading

External links

This article is based upon a translation of the Italian language version as at December 2010.

Transport in Cuneo
Railway stations in Piedmont
Railway stations opened in 1937
1937 establishments in Italy
Railway stations in Italy opened in the 20th century